Soon after the completion of 100 Greatest Britons poll in 2002, the BBC organized a similar opinion poll to find out the greatest Bengali personalities in the history of Bengali nation. In 2004, the BBC's Bengali Service conducted the opinion poll from 11 February to 22 March, with the title Greatest Bengali of All Time. Bengalis around the world, specifically from Bangladesh, India (states of West Bengal, Tripura, Orissa and Assam) and overseas Bengali communities participated in the poll.
 
A total of 140 nominations were produced from the opinion poll. The BBC started to announce the top 20 names from 26 March declaring one name each day starting from 20th position. On 14 April, the final day, which was also the Pohela Boishakh (Bengali New Year's day), the BBC announced Sheikh Mujibur Rahman, the founding father of Bangladesh, as the Greatest Bengali of All Time voted by Bengalis worldwide.

Methodology
Describing the process of voting, BBC's Bengali Service stated that to avoid any flaw or controversy, they followed the most modern method of opinion polling. Participants were asked to nominate their five choices of greatest Bengali personality on the order of preference instead of one. The top nominee of each voter was given five points, second nominee four points, thus eventually the fifth nominee got one point. On the basis of total points, the final list of the greatest Bengali poll was generated.

Observations
BBC informed that Sheikh Mujibur Rahman bagged almost double points than the second place holder Rabindranath Tagore, while Tagore himself secured double points than Kazi Nazrul Islam and Nazrul got double than A. K. Fazlul Huq. The other 17 personalities however had narrow differences of points with each other. Along with highest six politicians, the list also contains several authors and social reformers. Also two religious preachers, one scientist and one economist got place in the final list. Begum Rokeya was the only woman and Amartya Sen only living personality to be voted in top 20. No individual from the Bengal Sultanate and Mughal Bengal was nominated in the poll.

Top 20 of the list

See also 
100 Greatest Britons
The Greatest Indian

Notes

References

Further reading
 

Bengali
Bengali